3x3 basketball competitions at the 2022 Bolivarian Games in Valledupar, Colombia will be held from 26 June to 4 July 2022 at Parque Deportivo Garupal.

Two medal events are scheduled to be contested: a men's and women's tournaments. A total of 44 athletes (28 athletes–7 teams for men and 16 athletes–4 teams for women) will compete in the events. Both tournaments are open competitions without age restrictions.

This was the Bolivarian Games debut of 3x3 basketball for both men and women. 3x3 basketball made its first worldwide competitive appearance at the 2010 Summer Youth Olympics in Singapore and eleven years later debuted as an Olympic sport at the 2020 Summer Olympics (held in 2021) in Tokyo, Japan.

Participating nations
A total of 7 nations (5 ODEBO nations and 2 invited) registered teams for the 3x3 basketball events. Each nation was able to enter a maximum of 8 athletes (two teams of 4 athletes per gender). Hosts Colombia, Ecuador, Dominican Republic and Venezuela will participate in both events. Bolivia, Chile and Guatemala will only participate in the men's tournament.

Medal summary

Medal table

Medalists

Venue
All matches of both tournaments will be played at Parque Deportivo Garupal in Valledupar. The 3x3 basketball event had originally been scheduled to be held at Valledupar's Plaza Alfonso López. however it was eventually moved to the Parque Deportivo Garupal.

Men's tournament

The men's tournament will be held from 2–4 July 2022 and consists of a preliminary round (group stage) and a final round.

All match times are in COT (UTC−5).

Preliminary round
The preliminary round consists of a single group of 7 teams in which each team will play once against the other 6 teams in the group on a single round-robin basis, with the top four teams advancing to the semi-finals.

Final round
The final round consists of the semi-finals and the bronze and gold medal matches. The semi-finals match-ups are: 
Semifinal 1: Prel. round 1st place v Prel. round 4th place
Semifinal 2: Prel. round 2nd place v Prel. round 3rd place

Winners of semi-finals will play the gold medal match, while losers will play the bronze medal match.

Semi-finals

Bronze medal match

Gold medal match

Women's tournament

The women's tournament will be held from 26–28 June 2022 and consists of a preliminary round (group stage) and a final round.

All match times are in COT (UTC−5).

Preliminary round
The preliminary round consists of a single group of 4 teams in which each team will play twice against the other 3 teams in the group on a round-robin basis, with all the 4 teams advancing to the semi-finals.

Final round
The final round consists of the semi-finals and the bronze and gold medal matches. The semi-finals match-ups are: 
Semifinal 1: Prel. round 1st place v Prel. round 4th place
Semifinal 2: Prel. round 2nd place v Prel. round 3rd place

Winners of semi-finals will play the gold medal match, while losers will play the bronze medal match.

Semi-finals

Bronze medal match

Gold medal match

References

External links
Bolivarianos Valledupar 2022 Basketball

Basketball
Bolivarian Games
2022 Bolivarian Games